The Northwest Achievement Levels Test (NALT) is the paper version of the Computerized Achievement Levels Test, a test of student achievement.

References

Standardized tests in the United States
Education in California